Flavigny-sur-Moselle is a commune in the Meurthe-et-Moselle department in north-eastern France. On the night of 10–11 September 1944, the bridge across the river Moselle and the adjacent canal near the commune were the site of a fierce battle between American soldiers of the 134th Infantry Regiment, 35th Infantry Division, and German soldiers of the 15th Panzergrenadier Division.

See also
Communes of the Meurthe-et-Moselle department

References

Flavignysurmoselle